A-kinase anchor protein 12, aka AKAP250,  is an enzyme that in humans is encoded by the AKAP12 gene.

Function 

The A-kinase anchor proteins (AKAPs) are a group of structurally diverse proteins, which have the common function of binding to the regulatory subunit of protein kinase A (PKA) and confining the holoenzyme to discrete locations within the cell. This gene encodes a member of the AKAP family. The encoded protein is expressed in endothelial cells, cultured fibroblasts, and osteosarcoma cells. It associates with protein kinase A and C and phosphatase, and serves as a scaffold protein in signal transduction. This protein and RII PKA colocalize at the cell periphery. This protein is a cell growth-related protein. Antibodies to this protein can be produced by patients with myasthenia gravis. Alternative splicing of this gene results in two transcript variants encoding different isoforms.

Interactions 

AKAP12 has been shown to interact with Beta-2 adrenergic receptor.

References

External links

Further reading 

 
 
 
 
 
 
 
 
 
 
 
 
 
 
 
 

A-kinase-anchoring proteins